RFA Tidespring may refer to:

 , Tide-class replenishment oiler of the Royal Fleet Auxiliary, in service 1963–1991 
 ,  of the Royal Fleet Auxiliary in service since 2017

Royal Fleet Auxiliary ship names